Reticunassa festiva is a species of sea snail, a marine gastropod mollusk in the family Raphitomidae.

Description
The length of the shell attains 13 mm.

Distribution
This marine species occurs off China and Japan.

References

 Powys W.L. (1835). Characters and observations on new genera and species of mollusca and conchifera collected by Mr. Cuming). Proceedings of the Zoological Society of London. 1835: 93-96
 Cernohorsky W. O. (1984). Systematics of the family Nassariidae (Mollusca: Gastropoda). Bulletin of the Auckland Institute and Museum 14: 1-356

External links
 Dunker, W. (1860). Neue japanische Mollusken. Malakozoologische Blätter. 6: 221-240
 Galindo, L. A.; Puillandre, N.; Utge, J.; Lozouet, P.; Bouchet, P. (2016). The phylogeny and systematics of the Nassariidae revisited (Gastropoda, Buccinoidea). Molecular Phylogenetics and Evolution. 99: 337-353
 Gastropods.com: Nassarius (Niotha) festivus

festiva
Gastropods described in 1835